Jamal Al-Muhisin (15 March 1949 – 7 February 2022) was a Palestinian politician.

A member of Fatah, he was Governor of Nablus Governorate from 2007 to 2009.

Al-Muhaisen died from pulmonary fibrosis in Ein Kerem, Israel on 7 February 2022, at the age of 72.

References

1949 births
2022 deaths
Palestinian politicians
Fatah members
Central Committee of Fatah members
Governors of Nablus Governorate
Beirut Arab University alumni
University of Tripoli alumni
Charles University alumni
Members of the Palestinian National Council